Giorgio Adorno was a statesman who became doge of the Republic of Genoa for two years. His father was Adornino Adorno and his mother Nicolosia della Rocca and his brother, Antoniotto, was elected four times as doge of the Republic. He was born c. 1350 but little is known about his youth except that he married Pietrina Montaldo, daughter of the doge Leonardo Montaldo. With her he had nine children, including the future doge Raffaele Adorno.

Mandate

In 1396, the Republic of Genoa had joined the French kingdom but regained its independence on 21 March 1413. The short-lived government of the eight rectors rapidly gave way and Giorgio was elected doge less than a week later. On the diplomatic scene, Giorgio managed to regain some of the territories that had been given away by the French governor during the occupation. In particular, the Republic bought back numerous castles and villages from the Marquesse of Monferat and the Republic of Florence and regained control of the lower Piedmont and the Riviera.

An important step in the effort to stabilize the Republic was the promulgation of the new constitution. The main points of the new regime were the greater influence granted to the doge in the system, and the official allegiance to the Ghibelline fraction. In case of vacancy of the dogeship, the sovereignty of the Republic was to pass to the council of the Twelve Ancients.

Civil war 

Noble families had been locked in a series of conflict for several decades. The crisis came to an acme when Isnardo Guarco organized a revolt in the newly reconquered territories near Tuscany, but the rebellion was quickly sedated. In December 1414, Battista Montaldo led a strong Guelph faction constituted of the Spinola, Vivaldi, Grilli, Negroni, Da Mare and Imperiali families against the Ghibelline families (Fregoso, Giustiniani, Promontorio, Soprani) who supported the Adorno dogeship. Street battles and homicides unfolded despite the calls for peace by the Archbishop. Noble families that owned large tracts of land along the Rivieras as well as the Apennines and the Oltregiogo (e.g. Fieschi and Doria), took part in the street riots according to their own interests. Even the communities in these regions participated in the conflict, siding with factions such as the Doria-Campofregoso and Spinola-Adorno in Savona. Finally, in the early months of 1415 a truce was reached but to avoid being ousted, the doge demanded help from the Duke of Milan who sent 300 soldiers. In retaliation, the Guelph fraction asked help from the Marquesse of Monferrat.

Faced with the collapse of the city, Barnaba di Guano, Giacomo Giustiniani and Antonio Doria gathered in the cathedral of Saint Lawrence and called for the end of the conflict. Finally, they managed to convince Giorgio to renounce the dogeship. He resigned on March 1415. The rule of the Republic was left to the Government of the Two Priors, Tommaso di Campofregoso and Jacopo Giustiniani. Once ousted, Giorgio Adorno obtained the governorship of Caffa and a yearly stipend of 300 ducats.

References

15th-century Doges of Genoa
1350 births